Chemical Physics Letters is a biweekly peer-reviewed scientific journal covering research in chemical physics and physical chemistry. It was established in 1967 and is published by Elsevier. The editors-in-chief are David C. Clary, B. Dietzek, K-L. Han, and A. Karton.

External links
 

Chemical physics journals
Publications established in 1967
Elsevier academic journals
English-language journals